James Harris (November 2, 1858 – November 26, 1939) was an infielder in Major League Baseball. Harris played in 24 games for the Altoona Mountain Citys of the Union Association in 1884.

Sources

1858 births
1939 deaths
Baseball players from Pennsylvania
19th-century baseball players
Altoona Mountain Citys players
Major League Baseball first basemen
People from East Moline, Illinois
Hamilton (minor league baseball) players
Chattanooga Lookouts players
Denver Mountain Lions players
Hastings Hustlers players
Springfield, Ohio (minor league baseball) players
Canton Nadjys players
Detroit Wolverines (minor league) players
Port Huron (minor league baseball) players
Davenport Pilgrims players
Rockford Hustlers players